Scarborough Lifeboat Station is a Royal National Lifeboat Institution (RNLI) operated lifeboat station in Scarborough, North Yorkshire, England. A lifeboat was established at Scarborough in 1801, which makes it the third oldest lifeboat station in the United Kingdom (after  and ).

Since its opening in 1801 to the present day, a total of 16 crewmen have been lost whilst attempting rescues from the Scarborough lifeboat. In 2016, a new station was opened on the site of the previous one. This houses two lifeboats; the Frederick William Plaxton, a  lifeboat and the John Wesley Hillard III, an Inshore lifeboat.

History
The first lifeboat in Scarborough was instituted by public donation costing just over £212 and saw its first launch in November 1801, when it went to the aid of a stricken vessel named Aurora in Scarborough Bay. A replacement boat was built and supplied to the rescue crews in the town in 1823. The first lifeboat station was at the junction of Foreshore Road and Valley Road in the town. In 1821, the station was relocated near to its present site by the West Pier in the harbour, however it was on the landward side of Foreshore Road.

In 1914, the Scarborough Lifeboat Queensbury was despatched to assist in the rescue of the SS Rohilla off the coast at Whitby. Like many other lifeboats used in the rescue, she couldn't get near to the Rohilla because of the swell.

In 1940, a new lifeboat station was built next to the West Pier; the old lifeboat house was later converted into an amusement arcade on the seafront. The 1940 lifeboathouse had to be adapted for the larger Fanny Victoria Wilkinson and Frank Stubbs in 1991, which involved widening and heightening the door.

A new lifeboat station was opened in 2016, which had been designed by the York architectural firm of Brierley Groom. Approval for the new £3 million building was granted by the Borough Council in 2014.

In 2018, the coxswain of the crew was dismissed; the RNLI released a statement that he had organised an operational training exercise without proper authority. The former coxswain stated that he had "the blessing and clearance of the lifeboat operations manager and several others". After a groundswell of support for the sacked individual, the RNLI later released a further statement detailing their decision to stand down the coxswain citing the lack of trained professionals on the boat when she was put to sea in rough weather.

Notable launches

17 February 1836 – The crew launched to help a sloop named John as it was trying to enter the harbour area at Scarborough to shelter from the storm. As the lifeboat came close to the sloop, it capsized and ten of her crew were washed out to sea on a strong ebb tide. One crew member managed to get back onto the boat and three others were underneath the boat, having secured themselves to the boat to prevent the same fate that had befallen ten of their comrades. The three used the conduiting pipes (used to drain seawater out of the boat) set into the boat to allow them to breathe. A human chain was formed of spectators who eventually managed to rescue the four men from the sea.
 2 November 1861 – the crew launched their new life boat Amelia after a storm besieged the east coast. Many ships were trying to make port in Scarborough, and one, the Coupland, missed the harbour entrance and was being dashed against the rocks in the South Bay (where the Spa Theatre is). In the attempted rescue, two of the lifeboatmen died, with a further 22 people dying in the sea, including three who were spectators on the shore but waded into the water to help and were drowned.
The ECJR was launched at 11:30 am, but due to the heavy seas, she took over seven hours to reach the Westkust. As the lifeboat came alongside the sinking ship, two of the lifeboatmen jumped onto the Westkust to assess the situation, whilst the crew of the Westkust got into the lifeboat. As the two craft were side by side, they were being buffeted together and apart by the strong swell of the sea. One of the lifeboatmen managed to jump back into the lifeboat, but as the second tried, a freak wave wrenched the two ships apart, leaving him clinging to the rails of the Westkust. The swell then pushed the two boats together and crushed the lifeboatman between them. He fell into the lifeboat with a crushed pelvis and by the time they reached the port of Bridlington, he had died.
 8 December 1954 – whilst escorting ships into harbour during a storm, the lifeboat overturned in the South Bay at Scarborough. Three crew members died.

Fleet
In 2016, the crew at Scarborough accepted their new  lifeboat, the Frederick William Plaxton.

References

Sources

External links

Lifeboat stations in Yorkshire
Buildings and structures in Scarborough, North Yorkshire